The Elmwood Tower (formerly known as the Masonic Manor) is a high-rise residential building located at 801 South 52nd Street in midtown Omaha, Nebraska. Completed in 1963, the Elmwood Tower is a 321-ft (97-m) high-rise building, rising to 21 stories and currently the eighth tallest high-rise in Omaha.  The building provides residential apartments for people aged 50 and older.

See also
Economy of Omaha, Nebraska
List of tallest buildings in Omaha, Nebraska

References

External links
Official Website

Residential skyscrapers in Omaha, Nebraska
Midtown Omaha, Nebraska

Residential buildings completed in 1963
1963 establishments in Nebraska